Henry Stuart Carter or H. Stuart Carter (September 5, 1910 –September 17, 1985) was a Virginia lawyer, who served part-time for a dozen years representing Bristol, Virginia and Washington County in the Virginia House of Delegates. A member of the Byrd Organization, Carter participated in its Massive Resistance to racial integration.

Early and family life
Carter was born in 1910 on a farm in Big Stone Gap to Charles Samuel Carter and his wife Ida Spacht (originally from Pennsylvania). He was raised in Richmond, Wise County, Virginia with his older brother Charles and younger brother Dale. He was educated at Emory and Henry College, and then at the University of Virginia School of Law, receiving an LL.B. degree in 1935. He never married.

He enlisted in the U.S. Army in Roanoke in 1941 and served in World War II.

Career

Upon graduating law school and being admitted to the bar, Carter practiced in Washington County. He also was active in his Methodist church, the American Legion, and Veterans of Foreign Wars, as well as 40 and 8 and Elks  social organizations.

Carter was first elected to the Virginia House of Delegates in 1948, representing Washington County and Bristol together with J. Walter Gray, and replacing George M. Warren. He was re-elected numerous times. Keys S. Bordwine  replaced Gray as the county's other representative in 1950, and was in turn replaced by Fred C. Buck in the 1955 election.

During the Massive Resistance crisis in Virginia, Carter served in the Virginia House of Delegates and supported continued racial segregation, as did other members of the Byrd Organization. However, his cousin of similar name, Virginia State Senator Stuart B. Carter of Fincastle, Virginia led the moderate faction that respected the Supreme Court's Brown decisions, and opposed closing of public schools which integrated because of it.

Bristol's Commonwealth Attorney for a dozen years, Bradley Roberts replaced Carter as Bristol's delegate beginning in January 1960, and served together with Buck until both were replaced after the 1963 elections.

Death
Carter died in Bristol, Virginia on September 17, 1985.

References

1910 births
1985 deaths
University of Virginia School of Law alumni
Democratic Party members of the Virginia House of Delegates
People from Wise County, Virginia
Virginia lawyers
20th-century American politicians
People from Washington County, Virginia
People from Bristol, Virginia
20th-century American lawyers